Cabezón de Liébana is a municipality located in the autonomous community of Cantabria, Spain. According to the 2007 census, the city has a population of 708 inhabitants.

Villages
Aniezo
Buyezo
Cabezón de Liébana (Capital)
Cahecho
Cambarco
Frama
Lamedo
Luriezo
Perrozo
Piasca
San Andrés
Torices
Yebas

Gallery

References

External links
Cabezón de Liébana - Cantabria 102 Municipios

Municipalities in Cantabria